6-oxocamphor hydrolase (OCH, camK (gene)) is an enzyme with systematic name bornane-2,6-dione hydrolase. This enzyme catalyses the following chemical reaction

 bornane-2,6-dione + H2O  [(1S)-4-hydroxy-2,2,3-trimethylcyclopent-3-enyl]acetate

This enzyme is isolated from Rhodococcus sp.

References

External links 
 

EC 3.7.1